Gwynneth may refer to:

Gwynneth Vaughan Buchanan (1886–1945), Australian zoologist
Gwynneth Coogan (born 1965), American former Olympic athlete, educator and mathematician
Gwynneth Flower, former chair of the National Meteorological Programme
Gwynneth Holt (1909–1995), British artist of ivory sculptures on religious subjects
Emma Gwynneth Ineson, QHC (born 1969), British Anglican bishop and academic, specialising in practical theology
Helen Gwynneth Palmer (1917–1979), prominent Australian socialist publisher
Gwynneth Smith (born 1965), Irish former cricketer

See also
John Gwynneth (or Guinete) (1511–1557), clergyman of Welsh nationality originating from Gwynedd
Gwyneth